Fields of Fire is the third album by Corey Hart, released in 1986. It generated five charted singles.

Track listing

Personnel 
 Corey Hart – lead and backing vocals, keyboards 
 Gary Breit – keyboards, backing vocals (5)
 Jon Carin – E-mu Emulator II programming, E-mu SP-12 drum programming 
 Ritchie Close – E-mu Emulator II programming (6)
 Michael Hehir – lead and rhythm guitars, sitar (3)
 Russell Boswell – bass
 Bruce Moffat – drums 
 Frank Opolko – tambourine (10)
 Andy Hamilton – saxophones

Production 
 Corey Hart – producer 
 Phil Chapman – producer, engineer 
 Richie Cannata – co-producer (4, 9, 10)
 Andy MacPherson – additional engineer (6)
 Bob Ludwig – mastering
 Erika Gagnon – design, photography 
 Guido Harari – additional photography 
 Bruce Brault – management 
 Bob Ramaglia – management

Studios
 Recorded and Mixed at Revolution Studios (Cheshire, UK) and Le Studio (Morin-Heights, Québec, Canada).
 Mastered at Masterdisk (New York, NY, USA).

References

1986 albums
Corey Hart (singer) albums
Aquarius Records (Canada) albums
EMI America Records albums